Neodymium is a chemical element with the symbol Nd and atomic number 60. It is the fourth member of the lanthanide series and is considered to be one of the rare-earth metals. It is a hard, slightly malleable, silvery metal that quickly tarnishes in air and moisture. When oxidized, neodymium reacts quickly producing pink, purple/blue and yellow compounds in the +2, +3 and +4 oxidation states. It is generally regarded as having one of the most complex spectra of the elements. Neodymium was discovered in 1885 by the Austrian chemist Carl Auer von Welsbach, who also discovered praseodymium. It is present in significant quantities in the minerals monazite and bastnäsite. Neodymium is not found naturally in metallic form or unmixed with other lanthanides, and it is usually refined for general use. Neodymium is fairly common—about as common as cobalt, nickel, or copper—and is widely distributed in the Earth's crust. Most of the world's commercial neodymium is mined in China, as is the case with many other rare-earth metals.

Neodymium compounds were first commercially used as glass dyes in 1927 and remain a popular additive. The color of neodymium compounds comes from the Nd3+ ion and is often a reddish-purple. However, this changes with the type of lighting because of the interaction of the sharp light absorption bands of neodymium with ambient light enriched with the sharp visible emission bands of mercury, trivalent europium or terbium. Neodymium-doped glasses are used in lasers that emit infrared with wavelengths between 1047 and 1062 nanometers. These lasers have been used in extremely high-power applications, such as experiments in inertial confinement fusion. Neodymium is also used with various other substrate crystals, such as yttrium aluminium garnet in the Nd:YAG laser.

Neodymium alloys are used to make high-strength neodymium magnets—a type of powerful permanent magnet. These magnets are widely used in products like microphones, professional loudspeakers, in-ear headphones, high-performance hobby DC electric motors, and computer hard disks, where low magnet mass (or volume) or strong magnetic fields are required. Larger neodymium magnets are used in electric motors with a high power-to-weight ratio (e.g., in hybrid cars) and generators (e.g., aircraft and wind turbine electric generators).

Characteristics

Physical properties

Metallic neodymium has a bright, silvery metallic luster. Neodymium is a rare-earth metal that was present in the classical mischmetal at a concentration of about 18%. To make neodymium magnets it is alloyed with iron, which is a ferromagnet.

Electron configuration
In the periodic table, it appears between the lanthanides praseodymium to its left and the radioactive element promethium to its right, and above the actinide uranium. Its 60 electrons are arranged in the configuration [Xe]4f46s2, of which the six 4f and 6s electrons are valence. Like most other metals in the lanthanide series, neodymium usually only uses three electrons as valence electrons, as afterwards the remaining 4f electrons are strongly bound: this is because the 4f orbitals penetrate the most through the inert xenon core of electrons to the nucleus, followed by 5d and 6s, and this increases with higher ionic charge. Neodymium can still lose a fourth electron because it comes early in the lanthanides, where the nuclear charge is still low enough and the 4f subshell energy high enough to allow the removal of further valence electrons.

Chemical properties
Neodymium is the fourth member of the lanthanide series. Neodymium, like other lanthanides, usually has the oxidation state +3, but it can also form in the +2 and +4 oxidation states, and even, in very rare conditions, +0. Neodymium metal quickly oxidizes at ambient conditions, forming an oxide layer like iron rust that spalls off and exposes the metal to further oxidation; a centimeter-sized sample of neodymium corrodes completely in about a year. Nd3+ is generally soluble in water. Like its neighbor praseodymium, it readily burns at about 150 °C to form neodymium(III) oxide; the oxide peels off, exposing the bulk metal to the further oxidation:

Neodymium is a quite electropositive element, and it reacts slowly with cold water, or quickly with hot water, to form neodymium(III) hydroxide:

Neodymium metal reacts vigorously with all the stable halogens:

 [a violet substance]
 [a mauve substance]
 [a violet substance]
 [a green substance]

Neodymium dissolves readily in dilute sulfuric acid to form solutions that contain the lilac Nd(III) ion. These exist as a [Nd(OH2)9]3+ complexes:

Compounds

  
Some of the most important neodymium compounds include:
 halides: NdF3; NdCl2; NdCl3; NdBr3; NdI2; NdI3
 oxides: 
 hydroxide: 
 carbonate: Nd2(CO3)3
 sulfate: 
 acetate: Nd(CH3COO)3
 neodymium magnets (Nd2Fe14B)

Some neodymium compounds have colors that vary based on the type of lighting.

Organoneodymium compounds

Organoneodymium compounds are compounds that have a neodymium–carbon bond. These compounds are similar to those of the other lanthanides, characterized by an inability to undergo π backbonding. They are thus mostly restricted to the mostly ionic cyclopentadienides (isostructural with those of lanthanum) and the σ-bonded simple alkyls and aryls, some of which may be polymeric.

Isotopes

Naturally occurring neodymium (60Nd) is composed of five stable isotopes—142Nd, 143Nd, 145Nd, 146Nd and 148Nd, with 142Nd being the most abundant (27.2% of the natural abundance)—and two radioisotopes with extremely long half-lives, 144Nd (alpha decay with a half-life (t1/2) of 2.29×1015 years) and 150Nd (double beta decay, t1/2 ≈ 7×1018 years). In all, 33 radioisotopes of neodymium have been detected , with the most stable radioisotopes being the naturally occurring ones: 144Nd and 150Nd. All of the remaining radioactive isotopes have half-lives that are shorter than twelve days, and the majority of these have half-lives that are shorter than 70 seconds; the most stable artificial isotope is 147Nd with a half-life of 10.98 days.

Neodymium also has 13 known metastable isotopes, with the most stable one being 139mNd (t1/2 = 5.5 hours), 135mNd (t1/2 = 5.5 minutes) and 133m1Nd (t1/2 ~70 seconds). The primary decay modes before the most abundant stable isotope, 142Nd, are electron capture and positron decay, and the primary mode after is beta minus decay. The primary decay products before 142Nd are element Pr (praseodymium) isotopes and the primary products after are element Pm (promethium) isotopes. Four of the five stable isotopes have been predicted to decay to isotopes of cerium or samarium and are only observationally stable. Additionally, some observationally stable isotopes of samarium are predicted to decay to isotopes of neodymium.

Neodymium isotopes are used in various scientific applications. 142Nd has been used for the production of short-lived Tm and Yb isotopes. 146Nd has been suggested for the production of 147Pm, which is a source of radioactive power. Several neodymium isotopes have been used for the production of other promethium isotopes. The decay from 147Sm (t1/2 = 1.06 × 1011) to the stable 143Nd allows samarium–neodymium dating. 150Nd has also been used to study double beta decay.

History

In 1751, the Swedish mineralogist Axel Fredrik Cronstedt discovered a heavy mineral from the mine at Bastnäs, later named cerite. Thirty years later, fifteen-year-old Wilhelm Hisinger, a member of the family owning the mine, sent a sample to Carl Scheele, who did not find any new elements within. In 1803, after Hisinger had become an ironmaster, he returned to the mineral with Jöns Jacob Berzelius and isolated a new oxide, which they named ceria after the dwarf planet Ceres, which had been discovered two years earlier. Ceria was simultaneously and independently isolated in Germany by Martin Heinrich Klaproth. Between 1839 and 1843, ceria was shown to be a mixture of oxides by the Swedish surgeon and chemist Carl Gustaf Mosander, who lived in the same house as Berzelius; he separated out two other oxides, which he named lanthana and didymia. He partially decomposed a sample of cerium nitrate by roasting it in air and then treating the resulting oxide with dilute nitric acid. The metals that formed these oxides were thus named lanthanum and didymium, officially discovered in Vienna in 1885 by Carl Gustaf Mosander. Von Welsbach confirmed the separation by spectroscopic analysis, but the products were of relatively low purity. Didymium was discovered by Carl Gustaf Mosander in 1841, and pure neodymium was isolated from it in 1925. The name neodymium is derived from the Greek words neos (νέος), new, and didymos (διδύμος), twin.

Double nitrate crystallization was the means of commercial neodymium purification until the 1950s. Lindsay Chemical Division was the first to commercialize large-scale ion-exchange purification of neodymium. Starting in the 1950s, high purity (>99%) neodymium was primarily obtained through an ion exchange process from monazite, a mineral rich in rare-earth elements. The metal is obtained through electrolysis of its halide salts. Currently, most neodymium is extracted from bastnäsite and purified by solvent extraction. Ion-exchange purification is used for the highest purities (typically >99.99%). The evolving technology, and improved purity of commercially available neodymium oxide, was reflected in the appearance of neodymium glasses in collections today. Early neodymium glasses made in the 1930s have a more reddish or orange tinge than modern versions, which are more cleanly purple, because of the difficulties in removing traces of praseodymium using early technology, namely fractional crystallization.

Because of its role in permanent magnets used for direct-drive wind turbines, it has been argued that neodymium will be one of the main objects of geopolitical competition in a world running on renewable energy. This perspective has been criticised for failing to recognise that most wind turbines do not use permanent magnets, and for underestimating the power of economic incentives for expanded production.

Occurrence and production

Occurrence

Neodymium is rarely found in nature as a free element, instead occurring as ores, such as monazite and bastnäsite (these are mineral group names rather than single mineral names) that contain small amounts of all rare-earth metals. In these minerals neodymium is rarely dominant; some exceptions include monazite-(Nd) and kozoite-(Nd). The main mining areas are in China, United States, Brazil, India, Sri Lanka, and Australia. World reserves of neodymium are estimated at eight million tonnes.

The Nd3+ ion is similar in size to the early lanthanides of the cerium group (those from lanthanum up to samarium and europium) that immediately follow in the periodic table, and hence it tends to occur along with them in phosphate, silicate and carbonate minerals, such as monazite (MIIIPO4) and bastnäsite (MIIICO3F), where M refers to all the rare-earth metals except scandium and the radioactive promethium (mostly Ce, La, and Y, with somewhat less Pr and Nd). Bastnäsite is usually lacking in thorium and the heavy lanthanides, and the purification of the light lanthanides from it is less involved. The ore, after being crushed and ground, is first treated with hot concentrated sulfuric acid, evolving carbon dioxide, hydrogen fluoride, and silicon tetrafluoride. The product is then dried and leached with water, leaving the early lanthanide ions, including lanthanum, in solution.

In space
Neodymium's per-particle abundance in the Solar System is 0.083 ppb (parts per billion). This figure is about two thirds of that of platinum, but two and a half times more than mercury, and nearly five times more than gold. The lanthanides are not usually found in space, and are much more abundant in the Earth's crust.

In the Earth's crust

Neodymium is classified as a lithophile under the Goldschmidt classification, meaning that it is generally found combined with oxygen. Although it belongs to the rare-earth metals, neodymium is not rare at all. Its abundance in the Earth's crust is about 38 mg/kg, making it the 27th most common element. It is similar in abundance to lanthanum. Cerium is the most common rare-earth metal, followed by neodymium, and then lanthanum.

Production
The world's production of neodymium was about 7,000 tons in 2004. The bulk of current production is from China. Historically, the Chinese government imposed strategic material controls on the element, causing large fluctuations in prices. The uncertainty of pricing and availability have caused companies (particularly Japanese ones) to create permanent magnets and associated electric motors with fewer rare-earth metals; however, so far they have been unable to eliminate the need for neodymium. According to the US Geological Survey, Greenland holds the largest reserves of undeveloped rare-earth deposits, particularly neodymium. Mining interests clash with native populations at those sites, due to the release of radioactive substances during the mining process.

Neodymium is typically 10–18% of the rare-earth content of commercial deposits of the light rare-earth-element minerals bastnäsite and monazite. With neodymium compounds being the most strongly colored for the trivalent lanthanides, it can occasionally dominate the coloration of rare-earth minerals when competing chromophores are absent. It usually gives a pink coloration. Outstanding examples of this include monazite crystals from the tin deposits in Llallagua, Bolivia; ancylite from Mont Saint-Hilaire, Quebec, Canada; or lanthanite from the Saucon Valley, Pennsylvania, United States. As with neodymium glasses, such minerals change their colors under the differing lighting conditions. The absorption bands of neodymium interact with the visible emission spectrum of mercury vapor, with the unfiltered shortwave UV light causing neodymium-containing minerals to reflect a distinctive green color. This can be observed with monazite-containing sands or bastnäsite-containing ore.

The demand for mineral resources, such as rare-earth elements (including neodymium) and other critical materials, has been rapidly increasing owing to the growing human population and industrial development. Recently, the requirement for a low-carbon society has led to a significant demand for energy-saving technologies such as batteries, high-efficiency motors, renewable energy sources, and fuel cells. Among these technologies, permanent magnets are often used to fabricate high-efficiency motors, with neodymium-iron-boron magnets (Nd2Fe14B sintered and bonded magnets; hereinafter referred to as NdFeB magnets) being the main type of permanent magnet in the market since their invention. NdFeB magnets are used in hybrid electric vehicles (HEVs), plug-in hybrid electric vehicles (PHEVs), electric vehicles (EVs), and fuel cell vehicles (FCVs) (hereinafter referred to as xEVs), wind turbines, home appliances, computers, and many small consumer electronic devices. Furthermore, they are indispensable for energy savings. Toward achieving the objectives of the Paris Agreement, the demand for NdFeB magnets is expected to increase significantly in the future.

Applications
 Neodymium has an unusually large specific heat capacity at liquid-helium temperatures, so is useful in cryocoolers.
 Neodymium acetate can be a substitute for the radioactive and toxic uranyl acetate (used as a standard contrasting agent in electron microscopy).
 Probably because of similarities to Ca2+, Nd3+ has been reported to promote plant growth. Rare-earth element compounds are frequently used in China as fertilizer.
 Samarium–neodymium dating is useful for determining the age relationships of rocks. and meteorites
Neodymium isotopes recorded in marine sediments are used to reconstruct changes in past ocean circulation.

Magnets

Neodymium magnets (actually an alloy, Nd2Fe14B) are the strongest permanent magnets known. A neodymium magnet of a few tens of grams can lift a thousand times its own weight, and can snap together with enough force to break bones. These magnets are cheaper, lighter, and stronger than samarium–cobalt magnets. However, they are not superior in every aspect, as neodymium-based magnets lose their magnetism at lower temperatures and tend to corrode, while samarium–cobalt magnets do not.

Neodymium magnets appear in products such as microphones, professional loudspeakers, headphones, guitar and bass guitar pick-ups, and computer hard disks where low mass, small volume, or strong magnetic fields are required. Neodymium is used in the electric motors of hybrid and electric automobiles and in the electricity generators of some designs of commercial wind turbines (only wind turbines with "permanent magnet" generators use neodymium). For example, drive electric motors of each Toyota Prius require  of neodymium per vehicle.

In 2020, physics researchers at Radboud University and Uppsala University announced they had observed a behavior known as "self-induced spin glass" in the atomic structure of neodymium. One of the researchers explained, "…we are specialists in scanning tunneling microscopy. It allows us to see the structure of individual atoms, and we can resolve the north and south poles of the atoms. With this advancement in high-precision imaging, we were able to discover the behavior in neodymium, because we could resolve the incredibly small changes in the magnetic structure."  Neodymium behaves in a complex magnetic way that had not been seen before in a periodic table element.

Glass

Neodymium glass (Nd:glass) is produced by the inclusion of neodymium oxide (Nd2O3) in the glass melt. Usually in daylight or incandescent light neodymium glass appears lavender, but it appears pale blue under fluorescent lighting. Neodymium may be used to color glass in delicate shades ranging from pure violet through wine-red and warm gray.

The first commercial use of purified neodymium was in glass coloration, starting with experiments by Leo Moser in November 1927. The resulting "Alexandrite" glass remains a signature color of the Moser glassworks to this day. Neodymium glass was widely emulated in the early 1930s by American glasshouses, most notably Heisey, Fostoria ("wisteria"), Cambridge ("heatherbloom"), and Steuben ("wisteria"), and elsewhere (e.g. Lalique, in France, or Murano). Tiffin's "twilight" remained in production from about 1950 to 1980. Current sources include glassmakers in the Czech Republic, the United States, and China.

The sharp absorption bands of neodymium cause the glass color to change under different lighting conditions, being reddish-purple under daylight or yellow incandescent light, but blue under white fluorescent lighting, or greenish under trichromatic lighting. This color-change phenomenon is highly prized by collectors. In combination with gold or selenium, red colors are produced. Since neodymium coloration depends upon "forbidden" f-f transitions deep within the atom, there is relatively little influence on the color from the chemical environment, so the color is impervious to the thermal history of the glass. However, for the best color, iron-containing impurities need to be minimized in the silica used to make the glass. The same forbidden nature of the f-f transitions makes rare-earth colorants less intense than those provided by most d-transition elements, so more has to be used in a glass to achieve the desired color intensity. The original Moser recipe used about 5% of neodymium oxide in the glass melt, a sufficient quantity such that Moser referred to these as being "rare-earth doped" glasses. Being a strong base, that level of neodymium would have affected the melting properties of the glass, and the lime content of the glass might have had to be adjusted accordingly.

Light transmitted through neodymium glasses shows unusually sharp absorption bands; the glass is used in astronomical work to produce sharp bands by which spectral lines may be calibrated. Another application is the creation of selective astronomical filters to reduce the effect of light pollution from sodium and fluorescent lighting while passing other colours, especially dark red hydrogen-alpha emission from nebulae. Neodymium is also used to remove the green color caused by iron contaminants from glass.

Neodymium is a component of "didymium" (referring to mixture of salts of neodymium and praseodymium) used for coloring glass to make welder's and glass-blower's goggles; the sharp absorption bands obliterate the strong sodium emission at 589 nm. The similar absorption of the yellow mercury emission line at 578 nm is the principal cause of the blue color observed for neodymium glass under traditional white-fluorescent lighting. Neodymium and didymium glass are used in color-enhancing filters in indoor photography, particularly in filtering out the yellow hues from incandescent lighting. Similarly, neodymium glass is becoming widely used more directly in incandescent light bulbs. These lamps contain neodymium in the glass to filter out yellow light, resulting in a whiter light which is more like sunlight. During World War I, didymium mirrors were reportedly used to transmit Morse Code across battlefields. Similar to its use in glasses, neodymium salts are used as a colorant for enamels.

Lasers
Certain transparent materials with a small concentration of neodymium ions can be used in lasers as gain media for infrared wavelengths (1054–1064 nm), e.g. Nd:YAG (yttrium aluminium garnet), Nd:YAP (yttrium aluminium perovskite), Nd:YLF (yttrium lithium fluoride), Nd:YVO4 (yttrium orthovanadate), and Nd:glass. Neodymium-doped crystals (typically Nd:YVO4) generate high-powered infrared laser beams which are converted to green laser light in commercial DPSS hand-held lasers and laser pointers.

Trivalent neodymium ion Nd3+ was the first lanthanide from rare-earth elements used for the generation of laser radiation. The Nd:CaWO4 laser was developed in 1961. Historically, it was the third laser which was put into operation (the first was ruby, the second the U3+:CaF laser). Over the years the neodymium laser became one of the most used lasers for application purposes. The success of the Nd3+ ion lies in the structure of its energy levels and in the spectroscopic properties suitable for the generation of laser radiation. In 1964 Geusic et al. demonstrated the operation of neodymium ion in YAG matrix Y3Al5O12. It is a four-level laser with lower threshold and with excellent mechanical and temperature properties. For optical pumping of this material it is possible to use non-coherent flashlamp radiation or a coherent diode beam.

The current laser at the UK Atomic Weapons Establishment (AWE), the HELEN (High Energy Laser Embodying Neodymium) 1-terawatt neodymium-glass laser, can access the midpoints of pressure and temperature regions and is used to acquire data for modeling on how density, temperature, and pressure interact inside warheads. HELEN can create plasmas of around 106 K, from which opacity and transmission of radiation are measured.

Neodymium glass solid-state lasers are used in extremely high power (terawatt scale), high energy (megajoules) multiple beam systems for inertial confinement fusion. Nd:glass lasers are usually frequency tripled to the third harmonic at 351 nm in laser fusion devices.

Substitute for uranyl acetate

Uranyl acetate has been the standard contrasting agent in transmission electron microscopy (TEM) for decades. However, its use is increasingly hampered by regulations by governments due to its radioactive properties as well as its high toxicity. Therefore, alternatives are being searched for, including lanthanide acetates or platinum blue  as well as the use of less defined substances such as oolong tea extract. Despite these published alternatives, uranyl acetate (UAc) is still the standard for EM contrasting.

In the periodic table the vertical ordering of elements in groups is based on the presence of the same number of electrons in their outermost shell, which determines their chemical and physical properties. Because neodymium (Nd) is right above uranium (U) the chemical properties of UAc and NdAc would be very similar in binding to tissue in ultrathin sections thus leading to a similar amount of contrast.

Biological role and precautions

The early lanthanides have been found to be essential to some methanotrophic bacteria living in volcanic mudpots, such as Methylacidiphilum fumariolicum: lanthanum, cerium, praseodymium, and neodymium are about equally effective. Neodymium is otherwise not known to have a biological role in any other organisms.

Neodymium metal dust is combustible and therefore an explosion hazard. Neodymium compounds, as with all rare-earth metals, are of low to moderate toxicity; however, its toxicity has not been thoroughly investigated. Neodymium salts are regarded as more toxic if they are soluble than if they are insoluble if they are ingested. Neodymium dust and salts are very irritating to the eyes and mucous membranes, and moderately irritating to skin. Breathing the dust can cause lung embolisms, and accumulated exposure damages the liver. Neodymium also acts as an anticoagulant, especially when given intravenously.

Neodymium magnets have been tested for medical uses such as magnetic braces and bone repair, but biocompatibility issues have prevented widespread application.  Commercially available magnets made from neodymium are exceptionally strong and can attract each other from large distances. If not handled carefully, they come together very quickly and forcefully, causing injuries. For example, there is at least one documented case of a person losing a fingertip when two magnets he was using snapped together from 50 cm away.

Another risk of these powerful magnets is that if more than one magnet is ingested, they can pinch soft tissues in the gastrointestinal tract. This has led to an estimated 1,700 emergency room visits and necessitated the recall of the Buckyballs line of toys, which were construction sets of small neodymium magnets.

See also
Neodymium compounds
:Category:Neodymium compounds
Lanthanides
Period 6 elements
Rare earth metals

Notes

References

Bibliography

 R. J. Callow, The Industrial Chemistry of the Lanthanons, Yttrium, Thorium, and Uranium, Pergamon Press, 1967.

External links

 WebElements.com—Neodymium
 It's Elemental—The element Neodymium
 Neodymium at The Periodic Table of Videos (University of Nottingham)
EnvironmentalChemistry.com – Neodymium
Pictures and more details about Neodymium metal

 
Chemical elements
Chemical elements with double hexagonal close-packed structure
Energy development
Lanthanides
Reducing agents
Renewable energy technology